Sami Azara al-Majun (born 1932) was Minister of Labor and Social Affairs in the cabinet appointed by the Interim Iraq Governing Council in September 2003. A Shia Muslim and tribal leader from Samawah in Southern Iraq, al-Majun worked for the Saudi justice ministry from 1971 to 1980. He is a former member of the Iraqi National Congress.

References
 

Government ministers of Iraq
1932 births
Living people
People from Samawah
Iraqi National Congress politicians